David Ciekanski (born 14 December 1996), better known by his stage name Matt Fax, is a French electronic music DJ and record producer.

Having started his career in 2009, Fax encountered early success with support from renowned DJs and artists around the world, such as Depeche Mode, Armin van Buuren, Above & Beyond and Gareth Emery. Throughout his career, he has produced numerous tracks and remixes which entered multiple Beatport charts. His music is a blend of progressive house, trance music and techno.

As David R. and Mike Duz (2009–2012) 

David was introduced to music at an early age, mostly to rock music bands like Queen, Scorpions, AC/DC and French artists. His passion for electronic music came later by discovering Tiësto, which led to him wanting to be a DJ, and Joachim Garraud, which introduced him to music production. He also been introduced to hardcore music by his brother. He started producing and releasing his first tracks at the age of 13 under the alias David R., and had initial support from Laurent Garnier, playing his track "Technocolor" in a couple of his sets. He changed his name to Mike Duz a few years later, where he shifted from techno to electro house and progressive house. He had numerous releases on smaller independent record labels, until he was able to release a remix for Moguai on deadmau5's label mau5trap on 7 November 2011. He then changed his name to his current pseudonym, Matt Fax.

As Matt Fax (2012–present)

The beginnings (2012–2013)
The first release under his Matt Fax alias was on 9 May 2012 on Balkan Connection. Throughout the year, he released most of his music on various small labels, until Jaytech and Above & Beyond, among others, started playing his music regularly. He signed with Silk Music later the year, where he released a couple of EPs and remixes through the multiples division for two years.

In early 2013, at the age of 16, he signed with Enhanced Music and released his first EP Late Night/Broadway under the Colorize sub-label, where Matt is still one of the most active artists today. Later in the year, he was asked to remix Jaytech on Anjunabeats, and was invited as a guest mixer on Group Therapy, Above & Beyond's radio show. The trio stated that Matt was "the youngest guestmixer to be invited on the show" and became "a regular fixture on Group Therapy". He also hosted a couple of episodes of Anjunabeats Worldwide, the trio's secondary show principally hosted by Anjunabeats artists. The same year, he remixed The Blizzard's classic "Piercing the Fog" on Armada Music, as well as Johan Vilborg & Adam Szabo's hit "Two to One" on Enhanced Music.

Hiatus (2014)
The next year, Matt released a couple of EPs on Colorize, as well as the single "Shift" on 4 August 2014, which remained one of his highest selling track for a few years. The track was revisited as a chill-out version in 2015.

In August, he announced he was considering quitting music. In a couple of interviews two years later, he admitted posting similar posts every year, as he had never been sure of his own choices.

On 29 December 2014, a retrospective compilation of Matt's works on Silk Music was released, marking his departure of the label. On a Q&A session on his Facebook page, someone asked if new material would be released on Silk Music, where Matt stated he had departed from the label and was not engaged in any projects for the moment.

Comeback and breakthrough (2015–2016)

While a possible come-back was teased with his appearance DJ set at Above & Beyond's afterparty in Paris in January, he released the "Going Down/Hyperspace" EP on Colorize on 13 April 2015. Both tracks were supported by DJs around the world, including Armin van Buuren which played "Going Down" in Mumbai for the A State of Trance Festival warm-up. Throughout the year, he released the singles "Supertaper", "Tumble", "Moonlight", "Alpenglow" and "Aeris" (in collaboration with Jaytech), as well as the Belong/Mirth and CNFS/Stuck EPs, which were all supported on numerous radio shows and podcast from recognized DJ's around the world, as well as being regularly played on radio stations such as Sirius XM.

On 5 February Matt released his new single "Warmrider", which he defined as "a tribute to the Progressive sound he used to love", as well as a contribution for ZeroThree's compilation #REALPROG V.2 called "Vina" and the Wrath EP on the same label.

On 11 March he released a new remix on Anjunabeats for Boom Jinx and Aruna's single "Light as a Feather", which was critically acclaimed. The release led to a second guest mix on Group Therapy, where he played a couple of his upcoming projects. He also played his first gig at Ministry of Sound in London on 18 March, playing at the same time as Andy Moor in another room.

His next EP, Careless/Huntdown, was released on 6 May on Colorize, and marked the 4th anniversary of Matt Fax. The EP ranked 7 on the Beatport Top 10 and the track "Careless" has been played more than 500,000 times on Spotify, as well as being supported by DJs like Ferry Corsten, Cosmic Gate and Sam Feldt. A few weeks after the release, Matt unveiled a bonus track called "Backdraft" and was exclusively distributed on Bandcamp, on a pay-what-you-want payment basis.

Almost two months after the unveiling of the last EP, Armin van Buuren and Above & Beyond premiered the Horizon/Blimp EP in their respective radio shows. The EP was released on 8 July on Colorize, and showed a less deeper and more Balearic, soulful and almost clubbier sound than the "Careless / Huntdown" EP. The EP made the Beatport Progressive House Top 100 in only 4 days, and the title track Horizon been ranked 27 in the Progressive House tracks on Beatport, making it Matt's best-selling track.

On 21 June, he was invited on Gareth Emery radio show Electric for Life and debuted his remix of his track "Hands", which was then released on 15 July. Gareth admitted being "such a big fan of this guy". He also remixed Tritonal single "Getaway" on Enhanced Music.

In the meantime, he released numerous singles, including "Progressia" on Gareth Emery's label Garuda, "Upward" on Avanti, a division of Black Hole Recordings, two EPs on Statement! and Colorize, as well as two remixes for Solarstone and Alex Klingle. All of these releases have generally been well received by the critics.

Debut album and further releases (2017–present)
2017 saw Matt releasing less music than the past years. He released the EP Circles/Aura Lusia on 3 February and it was heavily supported by Pete Tong on BBC Radio 1, and Avicii on his radio show LE7ELS. His following release, "Phantom", was supported by Armin van Buuren in his radio how A State of Trance. During the year, he played alongside Madeon, Aazar and Kristian Nairn at the Bypass club in Geneva.

During the summer, Matt teased about forthcoming releases. In late July, he announced "Amnesiac", the first single from his debut album Contrast. The single was released on 4 August and charted 79 on the Beatport Progressive House Top 100. The following single "Close 2 U" was released on 1 September and was reviewed as 8.0/10 by DJ Mag. The full album was released on 6 October on Colorize and was streamed over 1 million time within a month on Spotify. Following the release, he was invited to Amsterdam to play a 20-minute guest mix and take part in an interview with Armin van Buuren on his radio show A State of Trance, making him the youngest guest on the show.

2018 saw him remixing high profile artists, such as Armin van Buuren, Andy Moor and tyDi. On 6 April, he played at the Ministry of Sound in London for the 10 Years of Enhanced Music. He also launched his Progressive House alias Matters, to focus on trance music under Matt Fax. His first EP Moves has been supported by Above & Beyond, Aly & Fila, Ruben de Ronde and Will Atkinson and accumulated over 300,000 streams on Spotify. The later Roof Park EP, has been reviewed as 8.0/10 by DJ Mag.

In October, Matt announced a collaboration with Grammy Award-nominated producer BT called "The Noetic". The single has been released on Armin van Buuren's label A State of Trance.

In 2019, he played at the A State of Trance 900 festival on February 23rd and other shows around the world, including Japan. His single "To the Ground" was rated 9.0/10 by DJ Mag, and has been included in the rotation playlist on Sirius XM Diplo's Revolution and Radio FG. DJ supports for the track includes Tiesto, Lane 8, Diplo, Gareth Emery and Simon Patterson, among others. The track has also been used in various advertising commercials, such as Jaguar or John F. Kennedy Center for the Performing Arts.

On 24 April 2020, Matt released his second studio album, Progressions.

Influences 

Matt has been compared to Eric Prydz and deadmau5, who is one of his main inspirations. He also cites Jon Hopkins, Boards of Canada and Radiohead as inspirations.

Discography

Albums

Extended plays

Singles

Remixes

References

External links
 Official website

1996 births
Living people
French DJs
French electronic musicians
French producers
Electronic dance music DJs
Anjunabeats artists
Armada Music artists
Monstercat Silk artists